Mount Ellery (Gunai: Barumpa), with an elevation of  AMSL, is a mountain that is part of the Errinundra Plateau within the Errinundra National Park, located in the East Gippsland region of the Australian state of Victoria.

Mount Ellery is the summit end-point for the proposed Sea to Summit walk in East Gippsland.

References

External links

 Engraving by Samuel Calvert

Ellery